Highlands Latin School is a private classical Christian school located in Louisville, Kentucky, United States. It serves students from Kindergarten through 12th grade. Founded in 2000 by award-winning Latin textbook author Cheryl Lowe and her family, the school currently enrolls 718 full time students in three campuses plus 300 students in a two-day Cottage School.

Families wanting a Highlands Latin education near their homes have started more than twenty Highlands Latin Schools across the United States.

Academics
The school gives special emphasis to Latin, mathematics, and music, which it calls the "three universal languages." Its education is founded on the belief that the study of ancient Greece and Rome give students a basis of comparison for English and American History.

Students study Latin starting in second grade and Greek in seventh grade. In 2015, 7 of 16 seniors were recognized as National Merit Finalists or Commended students.

History
Highlands Latin started as a part of Memoria Press, a classical Christian curriculum company founded by Cheryl Lowe, but since 2007, it has been an independent for-profit school owned by the Lowe family.

See also
List of schools in Louisville, Kentucky

References

External links
 

Private high schools in Kentucky
Private middle schools in Kentucky
Private elementary schools in Kentucky
Classical Christian schools
Christian schools in Louisville, Kentucky
Educational institutions established in 2000
High schools in Louisville, Kentucky
2000 establishments in Kentucky